Dogma is a 1999 American fantasy comedy film written and directed by Kevin Smith, who also stars with Ben Affleck, Matt Damon, George Carlin, Linda Fiorentino, Janeane Garofalo, Chris Rock, Jason Lee, Salma Hayek, Bud Cort, Alan Rickman, Alanis Morissette and Jason Mewes. It is the fourth film in Smith's View Askewniverse series. Brian O'Halloran and Jeff Anderson, stars of the first Askewniverse film Clerks, appear in the film, as do Smith regulars Scott Mosier, Dwight Ewell, Walt Flanagan, and Bryan Johnson.

The story revolves around two fallen angels who plan to employ an alleged loophole in Catholic dogma to return to Heaven after being cast out by God, but as existence is founded on the principle that God is infallible, their success would prove God wrong, thus undoing all creation. The last scion and two prophets are sent by the seraph Metatron to stop them.

The film's irreverent treatment of Catholicism and the Catholic Church triggered considerable controversy, even before its opening. The Catholic League denounced it as blasphemy. Organized protests delayed its release in many countries and led to at least two death threats against Smith. Despite this, Dogma was well received by critics, and grossed $44 million against its $10 million budget, becoming the highest-grossing film in the View Askewniverse series to date.

Plot

Bartleby and Loki are fallen angels, eternally banished from Heaven to Wisconsin for insubordination, after an inebriated Loki resigned as the Angel of Death at Bartleby's suggestion. In a newspaper article that arrives anonymously, the angels discover a way home: Cardinal Ignatius Glick is rededicating his church in Red Bank, New Jersey, in the image of the "Buddy Christ". Anyone who enters the church during the rededication festivities will receive a plenary indulgence, remitting all sins. Were the banished angels to undergo this rite—and then die after transmuting into human form—God would have no choice but to allow them re-entry into Heaven. They are encouraged by the demon Azrael and the Stygian triplets, three teenage hoodlums who serve Azrael in hell.

Bethany Sloane, a despondent abortion clinic counselor, attends a service at her church in McHenry, Illinois. Donations are solicited for a campaign to stop a New Jersey hospital from disconnecting life support on John Doe Jersey, a homeless man who was beaten into a coma by the triplets. Metatron—a seraph, and the voice of God—appears to Bethany in a pillar of fire and explains that if Bartleby and Loki succeed in re-entering Heaven, they will overrule the word of God, disprove the fundamental concept of God's omnipotence, and nullify all of existence. Bethany, aided by two prophets, must stop the angels and save the universe.

Now a target, Bethany is attacked by the triplets, who are driven off by the two foretold prophets, drug-dealing stoners Jay and Silent Bob. Bethany and the prophets are joined by Rufus, the 13th apostle, and Serendipity, the Muse of creative inspiration, now working in a strip club in search of inspiration of her own. Azrael summons the Golgothan, a vile creature made of human excrement, but Bob immobilizes it with aerosol air freshener.

On a train to New Jersey, a drunken Bethany reveals her mission to Bartleby, who tries to kill her; Bob throws the angels off the train. Bartleby and Loki now realize the consequences of their scheme; Loki wants no part of destroying all existence, but Bartleby remains angry at God for his expulsion, and for granting free will to humans while demanding servitude from angels, and resolves to proceed.

In New Jersey, Bethany asks why she has been called upon to save the universe; why can't God simply do it himself? Metatron admits that God's whereabouts are unknown; he disappeared while visiting New Jersey in human form to play skee ball. The task falls to Bethany because—she now learns—she is the last scion, a distant but direct blood relative of Jesus.

The group cannot persuade Glick to cancel the celebration. Jay steals one of Glick's golf clubs. Their only remaining option is to keep the angels out of the church, but Azrael and the triplets trap them in a bar to prevent them from doing so. Azrael reveals that he sent the news clipping to the angels; he would rather end all existence than spend eternity in Hell. Bob kills Azrael with the golf club, which Glick had blessed to improve his game. Bethany blesses the bar sink's contents, and the others drown the triplets in the holy water. They race to the church, where Bartleby has killed Glick, his parishioners, and assorted bystanders. When Loki (who is now wingless and therefore mortal, with a conscience) attempts to stop him, Bartleby kills him as well.

All appears lost; Jay attempts to seduce Bethany before all existence ends. When he mentions John Doe Jersey, Bethany finally puts all the clues together. She and Bob race across the street to the hospital, as the others try to keep Bartleby from entering the church. But in doing so, Jay destroys his wings with automatic gunfire, making him mortal as well. Bethany disconnects John's life support, liberating God, but killing herself. Bartleby reaches the church entrance where he confronts God, manifested in female form, who annihilates him with her voice. Bob arrives with Bethany's lifeless body; God resurrects her and conceives a child—the new last scion—within her womb. God, Metatron, Rufus, and Serendipity return to Heaven, leaving Bethany and the prophets to reflect on the past, and the future.

Cast

 Ben Affleck as Bartleby
 Matt Damon as Loki
 Linda Fiorentino as Bethany Sloane 
 Salma Hayek as Serendipity
 Jason Lee as Azrael
 Jason Mewes as Jay 
 Alan Rickman as Metatron 
 Chris Rock as Rufus
 Kevin Smith as Silent Bob
 George Carlin as Cardinal Ignatius Glick 
 Bud Cort as John Doe Jersey/God 
 Alanis Morissette as God                        
 Janeane Garofalo as Liz
 Betty Aberlin as Nun
 Barret Hackney, Jared Pfennigwerth, and Kitao Sakurai as the Stygian Triplets

Production

Development
On October 25, 2000, Kevin Smith wrote an essay titled In the Beginning... The Story of Dogma, which details the history and genesis of how Dogma came to be. His essay is available on the Dogma 2-disc Special Edition DVD.

Before Smith began writing Clerks, he began noting down ideas for a film called God. During his brief period in film school, he essentially wrote the scene introducing Rufus, but this version did not feature Jay and Silent Bob. During the development of Clerks, Smith continued to jot down ideas for his God project, including having the main character be a high school jock, the conception of 13th Apostle, Rufus, and a muse named Serendipity; but, Smith didn't have a story to work off of.

By the time Clerks had been picked up for distribution, Smith began writing the first draft for the film. He felt calling the project God was inappropriate, and retitled it Dogma. The first draft was completed in August 1994, with 148 pages accomplished, and more additions; the high school protagonist was changed to a stripper named Bethany who meets Jay and Silent Bob at a nudie booth, Azrael (or known throughout the script as the "Shadowy Figure") was introduced in the final 30 pages, and Bethany blew up the church in order to not let Bartleby and Loki pass through the archway. After Smith and Clerks producer Scott Mosier reread the draft, they decided that they didn't want Dogma to be their sophomore film; they didn't want to tackle a bigger scale picture until they felt ready to do it. Despite including the line "Jay and Silent Bob will return in Dogma" at the end of Clerks, Smith moved to Universal Studios in order to develop his next film, Mallrats.

During Mallrats production, Smith revisited the Dogma script and made some changes; Bethany's job went from stripper to an abortion clinic and included an orangutan for Jay and Silent Bob to hang out with. In 1996, he dropped the orangutan and reworked Bethany to be played by his then-girlfriend Joey Lauren Adams. During that time, he was writing Chasing Amy and got Ben Affleck to agree to be in both projects. After Chasing Amy was released to critical and box-office success, Smith felt confident enough to make Dogma.

Visual effects
Smith and  Mosier assembled a group of visual artists to realize their concept of a surreal, abstract environment "somewhere between reality and unreality": production designer Robert Holtzman, special effects supervisor Charles Belardinelli, creature effects supervisor Vincent Guastini, costume designer Abigail Murray, and director of photography Robert Yeoman.

Locations

Principal filming took place from April to June 1998. The triplets' attack on John Doe Jersey was filmed on the boardwalk in Asbury Park, New Jersey; all other scenes were shot in and around Pittsburgh, Pennsylvania. The Mexican restaurant in which Metatron explains Bethany's mission was the Franklin Inn in Franklin Park, north of Pittsburgh. Serendipity's pole dance and the Golgothan confrontation took place at the Park View Cafe (since renamed Crazy Mocha and later Yinz Coffee) on East North Avenue in Pittsburgh.  The heroes plan their final strategy in the Grand Concourse Restaurant in the restored Pittsburgh and Lake Erie Railroad Station.  St Michael's Church, site of the apocalyptic climax, is the Saints Peter and Paul Church—currently vacant—in East Liberty.

Casting

Jason Lee was initially attached to play Loki. When that role went to Matt Damon, due to his onscreen chemistry with Affleck in Good Will Hunting, Lee received the Azrael role due to scheduling conflicts with filming Mumford. Smith envisioned Samuel L. Jackson as Rufus, but was convinced to hire Chris Rock after meeting him.  Alan Rickman was recruited to play Metatron. Albert Brooks was offered the role of Cardinal Glick, but turned it down.

Critics expressed surprise at the film's eclectic casting, which Smith said was done deliberately to emphasize contrasts between characters — Rickman as the powerful Metatron, for example, opposite Mewes as the hopelessly verbose stoner Jay, "...a Shakespearean trained actor of the highest order next to a dude from New Jersey." Smith warned Mewes that he would have to take his acting to a higher level. "I really impressed upon him that he had to be prepared for this movie. 'There are real actors in this one,' we kept telling him." In response, Mewes memorized not only his own dialogue but the entire screenplay, because he "didn't want to piss off that Rickman dude".

Other unorthodox casting decisions included George Carlin, who had made his devout atheism a cornerstone of his public image, as a Catholic priest; Mexican actress Salma Hayek as Serendipity — "the [Muse] who throughout history inspired all the geniuses of art and music, like Mozart and Michelangelo, and never got any of the credit" — and singer-songwriter Alanis Morissette as God. "There's a Zen Buddhist serenity to Alanis that calls to mind something otherworldly," Smith explained. "She's definitely ethereal in nature, even when not speaking, and she carries an air about her that played into the role." Emma Thompson was originally attached to play God, but had to withdraw from the film when she became pregnant.

Being a fan of The X-Files, Smith offered the role of Bethany to Gillian Anderson. According to Smith, Anderson "really hated it."

Deleted scenes
On the film's official website, Smith described a scene that did not make the final cut: a climactic face-off in the hospital between Silent Bob, a badly burned and half-decomposed triplet, and the Golgothan. The battle was to end with the triplet killing Bethany (temporarily), and God, newly liberated, transforming the Golgothan into flowers. Test audiences felt the scene had "too much Golgothan", and the film's run time already exceeded two hours, so the scene was eliminated.

One scene that gained infamy among Kevin Smith's fanbase was known as the "Fat Albert sequence." When Bethany and Rufus find Jay & Silent Bob in the strip club, a gang in the club (led by Dwight Ewell) grows jealous that the stripper is paying more attention to Jay & Silent Bob than them. The gang confronts Jay & Silent Bob, and, thanks to Jay's insults, the gang draws guns on Jay & Silent Bob. Jay & Silent Bob then defuse the situation by taking to the stage and performing the theme song from Fat Albert. This whole incident makes Rufus realize that the stripper is the muse Serendipity, and she actually deescalated things by giving Jay & Silent Bob the idea. The scene was in the film when it screened at Cannes, but was removed from the film when it was released to theaters. The scene gained infamy as fans began speculating on Smith's View Askew message boards as to why it was removed. According to Smith on the Dogma: Special Edition DVD, he removed the scene because the feedback he received was that it ran on too long, and was not very funny.

Release
This film was originally scheduled for a November 1998 release, and to be released by Miramax Films, but due to controversy, the film was postponed for a 1999 release, and the rights were passed on to Lions Gate Films for the United States, although Miramax Films retained foreign distribution rights.

Dogma was released on DVD and VHS by Columbia TriStar Home Video in May 2000. This was followed by a 2-disc Special Edition DVD in 2001, and then on Blu-ray in 2008. Dogma is unavailable to stream or purchase digitally due to the film's rights being owned personally by Bob and Harvey Weinstein in a deal that predates streaming. It is also out of print on home media, leading to inflated prices among resellers. In 2022, in lieu of the release of Clerks III, Smith talked about trying to buy back the rights to Dogma from the Weinsteins. He claimed that both of his offers were "scoffed at" and added that "my movie about angels is owned by the devil himself."

Soundtrack

The soundtrack album accompanying the film was released in the United States on November 2, 1999, by Maverick Records. It features an orchestral score by Howard Shore, performed by the London Philharmonic Orchestra; and the song "Still", written, performed, and produced by Morissette. Stephen Thomas Erlewine of Allmusic described the "rich, effective" score as "alternately melodramatic and humorous".

 "Still" - Alanis Morissette - 6:18
 "Dogma" - 1:45
 "Behold The Metatron" - 4:29
 "Mooby the Golden Calf" - 2:53
 "The Golgothan" - 4:51
 "The Last Scion" - 3:22
 "Stygian Triplets" - 1:40
 "Bartleby & Loki" - 2:39
 "John Doe Jersey" - 6:54
 "A Very Relieved Deity" - 6:25

Several songs used in the film do not appear on the soundtrack, including "Magic Moments" performed by Perry Como, "Candy Girl" by New Edition, "Alabamy Bound" performed by Ray Charles, and others. In one scene, Matt Damon's Loki recites the hook of the Run-DMC song "Run's House".

Reception

Box office
Dogma was the third-highest-grossing film in its opening weekend, behind The Bone Collector and Pokémon: The First Movie, grossing $8.7 million. The film grossed a domestic total of $30.7 million from a $10 million budget. It remains the highest-grossing film in Smith's View Askewniverse series.

Critical response
On Rotten Tomatoes, the film has an approval rating of 67% based on 127 reviews, with an average rating of 6.25/10. The site's critical consensus reads, "Provocative and audacious, Dogma is an uneven but thoughtful religious satire that's both respectful and irreverent." On Metacritic, the film received a score of 62 out of 100, based on 36 critics, indicating "generally favorable reviews". Roger Ebert of the Chicago Sun-Times awarded the film three-and-a-half stars (out of four).

Some religious groupsin particular the activist Catholic Leaguedenounced the film as blasphemous.  Other groups staged protests outside theaters screening the film. Director Kevin Smith himself attended one of these protests, pretending to be opposed to the movie. Roger Ebert noted that no official objection came from the Catholic Church itself.  "We are actually free in this country to disagree about religion," Ebert wrote, "and blasphemy is not a crime."

Accolades

The film was screened, but was not entered in competition, at the 1999 Cannes Film Festival.

Cancelled sequel
In late November 2005, Smith responded to talk of a possible sequel on the ViewAskew.com message boards:

When asked about the sequel in October 2017, Smith said it would not happen, as he no longer desired to make any new religious films.

Near the same time as the cancellation, just weeks before the Weinstein scandal broke to the public, Harvey Weinstein pitched to Smith about doing a sequel. Not much came from this pitch, but it was just a mere idea for Weinstein. According to Smith in an interview with Business Insider, he recalls:

Smith believes that he only got the call because,  "It was him looking to see who was a friend still because his life was about to shift completely."

Damon returned to reprise his role as a reborn Loki in Jay and Silent Bob Reboot. In a fourth-wall breaking monologue, he explains after the events of Dogma God once again banished him to Earth, this time to the Mediterranean Sea where he was rescued by Italian fishermen after getting amnesia, describing the plot of Damon's film The Bourne Identity: he remarks that would make his current form his "reborn identity".

While promoting Clerks III, Smith reiterated that Weinstein still owned Dogma, and tried to buy the film's rights back once he was assured the money would not go directly to Weinstein, who is currently imprisoned. Despite increasingly larger offers from Smith's camp and a letter sharing how personal Dogma was for him, their offers were denied by Weinstein's lawyer. Smith described the film as a movie that is "held hostage" and shared his wish to both tour the film as a re-release and to produce a sequel if he would get the rights back.

See also
 List of films about angels

References

External links

 
 
 
 
 
 
 Why are Catholics so set on dogging "Dogma"? at Salon
 God Stuff: Kevin Smith Chases Jehovah
 Radio Interview with Kevin Smith from FBi 94.5 Sydney Australia

1999 films
Religious controversies in film
Christianity in popular culture controversies
Fiction about deicide
Films directed by Kevin Smith
Films critical of the Catholic Church
Films distributed by Disney
Films set in Wisconsin
Films set in New Jersey
Films shot in New Jersey
Films shot in Pittsburgh
Films with screenplays by Kevin Smith
Red Bank, New Jersey in fiction
Religious comedy films
Lionsgate films
1999 independent films
View Askew Productions films
View Askewniverse films
Fiction about God
Films scored by Howard Shore
Films about angels
Films set in 1998
1999 comedy films
Films produced by Scott Mosier
1990s English-language films